Jerald Sherrod Martin (born October 12, 1984) is a former American football safety. He was drafted by the Carolina Panthers in the second round of the 2009 NFL Draft. He played college football at Troy. Martin has also played for the Jacksonville Jaguars and Chicago Bears.

Early years
Martin was born in 1984 in Griffin, Georgia as one of three children to parents Diane and John. He has a brother named Cory and a sister named Chrystal. At age 9, Martin began playing football and continued through middle and high school. While at Griffin High, Martin played three seasons as a free safety and wide receiver under head coach Steve Devoursney. Griffin was elected team captain in his senior high school year. Griffin Daily News named him All-Purpose Player of the Year in 2002. In that same year, Martin caught seven passes for 177 yards and led the team and the region in punt returns. In Martin's senior year, the Kudzu Magazine named him to the All-Area team. Martin also played four seasons of basketball and competed two seasons in track and field.

College career
Enrolling at Troy University in 2004, Martin played strong safety while assigned as a reservist and member of special teams. He played 12 games during his initial season and was promoted to a starter. He was redshirted in 2006 after undergoing surgery on both his shoulders. By 2007, Martin was assigned to free safety. While attending Troy, Martin majored in Business Management.

Professional career

Carolina Panthers
Martin was drafted in the second round by the Carolina Panthers.

In his first career start against Arizona, Martin recorded two interceptions.

Jacksonville Jaguars
On December 30, 2013, the Jacksonville Jaguars signed Martin to a reserve/future contract. He was released on August 30, 2014. He was re-signed on September 23. He became a free agent after the 2014 season.

Chicago Bears
On June 18, 2015, Martin signed a one-year contract with the Chicago Bears. On September 6, 2015, he was released by the Bears. He was re-signed on October 6.

Personal life
Martin cut hair in his neighborhood growing up and for teammates in college. During his time with the Jaguars, Sherrod Martin trained to become a barber, preparing for a career after the NFL. Martin now currently works as a master barber in the Atlanta area with current and former NFL players.

References

External links
Carolina Panthers bio
Troy Trojans bio

1984 births
Living people
People from Griffin, Georgia
Players of American football from Georgia (U.S. state)
American football cornerbacks
American football safeties
Troy Trojans football players
Carolina Panthers players
Jacksonville Jaguars players
Chicago Bears players